Steve Stoll may refer to:
* Steve Stoll (musician) (born 1967), American techno musician and label owner
 Steve Stoll (politician) (born 1947), American politician